Eremias regeli  is a species of lizard found in Turkmenistan, Uzbekistan, Tajikistan, and Afghanistan.

References

Eremias
Reptiles described in 1905
Taxa named by Jacques von Bedriaga